Bruce Chalmers (October 15, 1907 – May 25, 1990) was a British-born and educated physicist, a metallurgy professor at Harvard University, a member of the National Academy of Sciences, an editor in chief of Progress in Materials Science, master of John Winthrop House at Harvard University.

An award has been established in his name - the Bruce Chalmers Award by the Minerals, Metals and Materials Society.
The National Academies Press said that he had "a notable career as a scientist, educator and editor".
Harvard University called him "an authority in the field of metallurgy".

His brother was the notable British atmospheric physicist, John Alan Chalmers (1904-1967).

Awards and Distinctions 
 the Saveur Award from the American Society of Metals
 the Clamer Medal from the Franklin Institute
 member of the National Academy of Sciences (1975)
 fellow of the American Academy of Arts and Sciences

References 

1907 births
1990 deaths
20th-century American physicists
Members of the United States National Academy of Sciences
American metallurgists
Harvard University faculty
Fellows of the American Academy of Arts and Sciences
Fellows of the Minerals, Metals & Materials Society
British emigrants to the United States